HMS Egeria was a 4-gun screw sloop of the  launched at Pembroke on 1 November 1873.  She was named after Egeria, a water nymph of Roman mythology, and was the second ship of the Royal Navy to bear the name. After a busy career in the East Indies, Pacific, Australia and Canada, she was sold for breaking in 1914 and was burnt at Burrard Inlet in British Columbia.

Construction
Egeria was constructed of an iron frame sheathed with teak and copper (hence 'composite'), and powered by a two-cylinder horizontal compound-expansion steam engine. This engine, provided by Humphrys, Tennant & Co., drove a single  diameter screw and generated an indicated .

Perak War
In 1875, Egeria, commanded by Commander Ralph Lancelot Turton, proceeded to Perak (in modern Malaysia), as one of a squadron of six ships under Captain Alexander Buller with his senior officer's pennant in HMS Modeste, to take part in an expedition against the murderers of Mr James Birch, the British Resident in Perak. While the troops and a naval brigade advanced on the upper reaches of the Perak River simultaneously from two points, Egeria blockaded the Perak Littoral, and sent her boats up the Kurow River. These boats destroyed or carried off some guns, arms, and ammunition which might have been useful to the enemy. Severe punishment was inflicted on the natives, but the murderers were not brought to account for some time afterwards.

Intelligence gathering in the Russian Far East
During the Russo-Turkish War of 1877–1878, Egeria, commanded by Commander Archibald Douglas, was sent on an intelligence gathering mission to Petropavlovsk in Kamchatka.  It was found to have been abandoned by its Russian garrison.

Survey of Australia
From 1886, under the command of Captain Pelham Aldrich, Egeria was engaged in survey around Australia.

In 1887 she called at Christmas Island.

In 1890 Hansard records that

Survey of British Columbia
In 1898, Egeria arrived in British Columbia where she was engaged in coastal surveys for the Royal Navy until 1910, by which time coast surveying responsibilities had been transferred to the Canadian Hydrographic Service. The previous surveying ship, the steamship Beaver, had been paid off 28 years earlier in 1870.

Commander Morris Henry Smyth was in command until Commander C. H. Simpson was appointed in command on 1 February 1900.

Egeria was primarily involved in resurveying settled areas of the British Columbia coast to create modern charts on a larger scale. The last survey it conducted was of Welcome Pass off the Sunshine Coast of British Columbia.

A representation of Egeria is included on a commemorative tile at the Marine Building at 355 Burrard St. in Vancouver, British Columbia. It is one of eight historic ships of British Columbia so honored by this Art Deco building which opened in 1930.

There is also an inscription carved into the rockface of a cliff overlooking Poets Cove on Pender Island, British Columbia. It says "1905 HMSEGERIA"

The galley and mess of HMCS Quadra at Goose Spit Site of 19 Wing Canadian Forces Base (CFB) Comox is named Egeria Hall after the HMS Egeria. It was constructed in 1995.

Decommissioning and sale
After many years in the Surveying Service, in November 1911 she was put up to public auction at Esquimalt, and sold to the Vancouver branch of the Navy League for £1,416.

Fate
She was sold for breaking up in 1914. Her hulk was beached at Burrard Inlet, she was soaked in oil and set afire. The explosion killed three men.

Legacy
HMS Egeria is commemorated in the scientific name of a species of lizard, Cryptoblepharus egeriae.

Notes

Bibliography

Bastock, John (1988), Ships on the Australia Station, Child & Associates Publishing Pty Ltd; Frenchs Forest, Australia.

External links

 

Fantome-class sloops
Ships built in Pembroke Dock
1873 ships
Victorian-era sloops of the United Kingdom
Survey vessels of the Royal Navy
History of Perak
History of British Columbia
History of Vancouver